Dangha  is a village and commune of the Cercle of Diré in the Tombouctou Region of Mali.

References

External links
.

Communes of Tombouctou Region